Fashion line could refer to:

 A fashion designer's haute couture line
 A fashion designer's or fashion house's ready-to-wear line